Eschatology is a part of theology and philosophy concerned with the final events when the world ends.

Eschatology can also mean:

Eschatology (book), a book by Pope Benedict XVI
Eschatology (religious movement), an early 20th-century religious movement created by William W. Walter

See also
End time (disambiguation)